Rongshui Miao Autonomous County is under the administration of Liuzhou, Guangxi Zhuang Autonomous Region, China. The seat of Rongshui County is Rongshui Town. It borders the prefecture-level divisions of Qiandongnan (Guizhou) to the north and Hechi to the west.

Rongshui Miao Autonomous County is the only Miao majority county in Guangxi, with 40 percent of the total population representing the Miao nation.

Demographics
Rongshui County has a total population of 485,120 (2007).

More than 70 percent of the population represents various ethnic minorities, such as the Miao, Yao, Dong, Zhuang and others. 40,81% of the total population belong to the Miao minority (2007).

Geography
Apart from the county town, Rongshui comprises many small villages and large rural areas. The county is mountainous, featuring both karst landscapes and larger mountain massifs such as the Yuan Bao Shan mountains. The river Rong (Rongjiang) flows through the county and passes by Rongshui town. The longest river within the county is the Bei River (Beijiang, not to be confused with the Beijiang tributary to the Zhujiang).

Administrative divisions
Rongshui County has 4 towns, 16 townships and 204 villages under its administration.

The towns include Rongshui, Hemu, Huaibao, and Sanfang.

The townships are Anchui, Antai, Baiyun, Dalang, Danian, Dongtou, Gandong, Gongdong, Gunbei, Hongshui, Liangzhai, Sirong, Tonglian, Wangdong, Xiangfen, and Yongle.

Transport
Highway G209 provides access to Rongshui from Liuzhou in the south and Guyizheng in the north (with highway G321 connecting from Guyizheng to Guiyang, the capital of Guizhou province, in the west).

Rongshui is serviced by trains connecting with Liuzhou in the south and Huaihua (Hunan) in the north, branching off to larger cities such as Guiyang (Guizhou), Changsha (Hunan), Wuhan (Hubei) and Zhengzhou (Henan).

Culture
Rongshui is known for the frequent festivals of its Miao population.

Their celebrations include the drum festival, sowing festival, seedling festival and horse-fighting festivals. The festivities are often accompanied by music played on the Lusheng, a reed-pipe wind instrument, and dancing and singing performances.

Climate

See also
 Rong River
 Sanjiang Dong Autonomous County

References

External links
Official website of Rongshui County government
Miao ethnic group celebrates Xinhe Festival
Schoolkids tuck into free lunches in Guangxi
Horsefight held to mark "Gulongpo Fair"
Rongshui photos on Flickr

Miao autonomous counties
County-level divisions of Guangxi
Liuzhou